The Crédit Mobilier scandal was a two-part fraud conducted from 1864 to 1867 by the Union Pacific Railroad and the Crédit Mobilier of America construction company in the building of the eastern portion of the First transcontinental railroad. The story was broken by The New York Sun during the 1872 campaign of Ulysses S. Grant.

A new company, Crédit Mobilier of America, was created by Union Pacific executives to actually build the line albeit at inflated construction costs. Though the railroad cost only $50 million to build, Crédit Mobilier billed $94 million and Union Pacific executives pocketed the excess $44 million. Then, part of the excess cash and $9 million in discounted stock was used to bribe several Washington politicians for laws, funding, and regulatory rulings favorable to the Union Pacific. The US government gave the Union Pacific empty land to sell in a checkerboard pattern, keeping every other plot. Eventually the fertile land was sold to farmers who shipped out the crops by rail. To get the new project funded, Washington loaned the Union Pacific federal bonds that could be used as collateral when the railroad needed to borrow money. The Union Pacific – like a third of all the nation's railroads – declared bankruptcy during the Panic of 1893. By late 1897 the national economy was quickly reviving and profitability was at hand. An agreement was reached to pay the US Treasury the entire amount of principal and accrued interest on the bonds. The government received every dollar it wanted from the Union Pacific.  

The scandal negatively affected the careers of many politicians and nearly bankrupted Union Pacific. For decades partisan newspapers used the scandal to create widespread public distrust of Republicans, Congress, and the federal government during the Gilded Age.

Background 

The scandal's origins dated to 1864, when the Union Pacific Railroad was chartered by Congress and the associated corporation Crédit Mobilier of America was established. This company had no relation to the major French bank Crédit Mobilier.

In the Pacific Railroad Acts of 1864–68, Congress authorized and chartered the Union Pacific Railroad and provided $100 million (equivalent to over $1.6B in 2020) in capital investment to complete a transcontinental line west from the Missouri River to the Pacific coast.

The offer initially attracted no subscribers for additional financing, as the conditions were financially daunting.

Obstacles to investment
The railroad would have to be built for  through desert and mountains, incurring extremely high freight costs for supplies. There was the likely risk of armed conflict with hostile tribes of Native Americans, who occupied many territories in the interior, and no probable early business to pay dividends.

There was no existing demand for railroad freight or passenger traffic for virtually the entire proposed route. Since no towns or cities of any size yet existed on the western prairies, there was no commercial activity between Nebraska and the California border. Nor were there any branch lines running either north or south of the proposed route that would have been able to feed their traffic to a new transcontinental railway. As a result, private investors refused to invest.

In spite of this, the entire railroad scheme was proposed as a "going concern" – a financially viable enterprise that relied on "below-market" financing and then could continue to function as a business enterprise, covering its operating expenses with freight and passenger revenues while providing profits for investors and interest payments to the US government for the borrowed capital (at the federal rate based upon the U.S. government bond rates), and ultimately retiring its debt to the U.S. government.

Opposition 
Opponents of the Pacific Railroad Acts felt the construction and its routing were being developed without regard for creating a viable and profitable transportation enterprise.
They believed the whole project was a bare-faced fraud by some capitalists to build a "railroad to nowhere" and to make tremendous profits doing so, while getting the United States government to bear the costs.

Formation of Crédit Mobilier of America 
George Francis Train and Thomas C. Durant, the vice president of the Union Pacific Rail Road, formed Crédit Mobilier of America in 1864.

Crédit Mobilier of America was a deliberate façade. Train and Durant aimed to present to both the government and to the public the appearance that an independent corporate enterprise had been impartially chosen as the principal contractor and construction management firm for the project. In fact, Crédit Mobilier was created to shield the company's shareholders and management from the common charge that they were using the construction phase of the project, as opposed to the operating phase, to generate profit. Because the conspirators believed they could not expect conventional profits from the operation of the railroad, they created the sham company so they could charge the U.S. government extortionate fees and expenses during the construction phase.

Allegations 
In simplified terms, the scheme worked as follows:

 The Union Pacific contracted with Crédit Mobilier to build the railway at rates greatly above cost.  However the UP usually paid with UP shares, which were not highly rated because of the uncertainty that the huge project could be completed and would generate future profits.
 The railroad was eventually a success and made money from selling land. Thus it eventually brought high profits to Crédit Mobilier, which was owned by Durant and the Union Pacific's other directors and principal stockholders.
 The outsize profits were divided among the Union Pacific stockholders.

The directors of the Union Pacific also engaged in stock manipulation circumventing requirements that they receive full payment for stock issued at par by instead paying Crédit Mobilier in bank checks, which Crédit Mobilier then used to purchase Union Pacific stock.

In every major construction contract drawn up between the Union Pacific and Crédit Mobilier, the contract's terms, conditions, and price were offered and accepted through the actions of the same corporate officers and directors, operating on both sides of the contract. The underlying fraud of a common and unified ownership of two companies that shared principal officers and directors was not revealed for years.

Coverup 
The principal means of the scheme was the method of indirect billing.

The Union Pacific presented genuine and accurate invoices to the U.S. government, as evidence of actual construction costs billed to them by Crédit Mobilier of America for payment. Any audit of the Union Pacific invoices to the government would have revealed no evidence of fraud or profiteering, because the fraud took place one level deeper, on the invoices from Crédit Mobilier to Union Pacific. Union Pacific was accepting for payment genuine Crédit Mobilier invoices (based on fraudulent accounting) and was applying only an overhead expense for management and administration.

If the Union Pacific's corporate officers had openly undertaken the management and construction of the railroad, this scheme to make windfall profits immediately from charges made during construction would have been exposed to public scrutiny by the opponents of the railroad project from the start.

Extent 
The Union Pacific paid $94,650,287 to Crédit Mobilier via the project, while Crédit Mobilier incurred operating costs of only $50,720,959.

Thus, the deal generated $43,929,328 (equivalent to over $724.9M in 2020) in profits for Crédit Mobilier, counting the Union Pacific shares and bonds that Crédit Mobilier bought and paid itself. The Crédit Mobilier directors reported this as a cash profit of only $23,366,319.81, a financial misrepresentation since these same directors were the recipients of the undisclosed $20,563,010 Union Pacific share of the total profits.

Bribery

Maury Klein, in his wide-ranging analysis of the scandal boils down the issue: "Did the builders of the road defraud the government? And did they attempt to gain influence in Congress through bribery? The evidence suggested that the answer to the first was no, and to the second a qualified yes."

In 1867, Crédit Mobilier replaced Thomas Durant with Oakes Ames. Ames, a member of Congress, distributed cash bribes and discounted shares of Crédit Mobilier stock to fellow congressmen and other politicians in exchange for votes and actions favorable to the Union Pacific. Ames offered to members of Congress shares in Crédit Mobilier at its discounted par value rather than the market value, which was much higher due to its superb (but fraudulent) profits and exclusive contract with the Union Pacific Railroad. It also declared substantial quarterly dividends on its stock.

Those allowed to purchase shares at par value could reap enormous capital gains simply by offering these discounted shares on the market, knowing that they would be purchased at a higher price by investors desiring to own stock in such a profitable company.

Revelation and political impact 

Following a disagreement with Ames, Henry Simpson McComb leaked compromising letters to The New York Sun, a reformist newspaper highly critical of incumbent President Ulysses S. Grant and his administration.

On September 4, 1872, the Sun broke the story. The newspaper reported that Crédit Mobilier had received $72 million in contracts for building a railroad worth only $53 million.

After the revelations, the Union Pacific and other investors were left nearly bankrupt.

Congressional investigation 
In 1872, the (Republican) House of Representatives submitted the names of nine politicians to the (Republican) Senate for investigation:

 Representative William B. Allison of Iowa
 Former Senator James A. Bayard Jr. of Delaware
 Former Representative George S. Boutwell of Massachusetts (then serving as United States Secretary of the Treasury)
 Senator Roscoe Conkling of New York
 Senator James Harlan of Iowa (retiring)
 Senator John Logan of Illinois
 Representative James W. Patterson of New Hampshire
 Senator Henry Wilson of Massachusetts, also Grant's current running mate for Vice President
 Vice President Schuyler Colfax

All of those named were Republicans except Bayard, a Democrat who was largely dropped from the investigation after he wrote a letter disavowing any knowledge. Ultimately, Congress investigated 13 of its members in a probe that led to the censure of Oakes Ames and James Brooks, a Democrat from New York.

During the 1872 campaign, Grant's running mate Henry Wilson initially denied involvement. However, in the February 1873 Senate investigation, Wilson admitted involvement and provided a complicated explanation claiming he had paid for stock in his wife's name, and with her money but had never taken possession of the shares. According to Wilson, when his wife (and later he himself) had concerns about the transaction, the transaction was reversed. Wilson's wife had died in 1870, so senators had to rely on Wilson's word and that of Ames, whose account corroborated Wilson's. The Senate accepted Wilson's explanation, and took no action against him, but his reputation for integrity was somewhat damaged because of his initial denial.

Senator Henry L. Dawes of Massachusetts was also implicated. Dawes had purchased $1,000 in stock and had received a dividend. Dawes later had doubts about the propriety of the stock purchase and cancelled it. Ames returned the purchase price to Dawes with interest and Dawes returned the dividend to Ames. Dawes received $100 in interest on his returned purchase price, but he was not further implicated.

Department of Justice investigation 
A Department of Justice investigation was also made with Aaron F. Perry as chief counsel. During the investigation, the government found that the company had given shares to more than 30 politicians from both parties, including James A. Garfield, Colfax, Patterson, and Wilson.

No charges were filed against any of the participants in the scandal. James A. Garfield denied the charges and was elected president in 1880.

In popular culture
This scheme was referenced in the AMC television series Hell on Wheels, (broadcast during 2011-2016) with the portrayal of Thomas Durant.

The scheme and scandal was proposed as a topic for a musical cabaret in season 10 of the FXX television series Archer.

See also
Crédit Mobilier, a bank in France that had no connection to the American company or the scandal
Grantism

References

Further reading

 Ambrose, Stephen E. Nothing like it in the world: The men who built the transcontinental railroad 1863-1869 (2000) excerpt; popular history

 Bain, David Haward. Empire Express: Building the First Transcontinental Railroad (1999); minute detail in 800 pages online

 Duran, Xavier. "The First US transcontinental railroad: Expected profits and government intervention." Journal of Economic History 73.1 (2013): 177-200. online
 Fogel, Robert William. The Union Pacific Railroad: A case in premature enterprise (Johns Hopkins Press, 1960).

 Green, Fletcher M.  "Origins of the Credit Mobilier of America." Mississippi Valley Historical Review 46.2 (1959): 238–251. in JSTOR

 Heier, Jan Richard. "Building the Union Pacific Railroad: a study of mid-nineteenth-century railroad construction accounting and reporting practices" Accounting, Business & Financial History  19#3 (2009) pp 327-351 http://dx.doi.org/10.1080/09585200903246775

 Kens, Paul. "The Crédit Mobilier Scandal and the Supreme Court: Corporate Power, Corporate Person, and Government Control in the Mid‐nineteenth Century." Journal of Supreme Court History (2009) 34#2 pp: 170–182.

 Klein, Maury. Union Pacific: The Birth of a Railroad, 1892-1893 (volume 1, 1987), the standard scholarly history; no footnotes in 1st edition but they are included in the paprrback edition of 2006. excerpt

 Martin, Edward Winslow (1873). - "A Complete and Graphic Account of the Crédit Mobilier Investigation". - Behind the Scenes in Washington. - (c/o Central Pacific Railroad Photographic History Museum).
 Mitchell, Robert B. Congress and the King of Frauds: Corruption and the Credit Mobilier Scandal (Edinborough Press, 2018) online review.

External links
 
 
 

Political scandals in the United States
History of rail transportation in the United States
1872 in the United States
Congressional scandals
Investigations and hearings of the United States Congress
Union Pacific Railroad